A list of notable politicians of the Liberal Democratic Party of Germany:

B 
 Helmut Baierl
 Uwe Barth
 William Borm

D 
 Johannes Dieckmann

E 
 Adolf Ernst
 Arno Esch

F 
 Karl-Hermann Flach
 Rolf Frick

G 
 Hans-Dietrich Genscher
 Manfred Gerlach

H 
 Karl Hamann
 Willi Hein
 Erhard Hübener

K 
 Waldemar Koch
 Wilhelm Külz

L 
 Arthur Lieutenant
 Walter Linse
 Hans Loch
 Marie Elisabeth Lüders

M 
 Peter Moreth

O 
 Rainer Ortleb

P 
 Cornelia Pieper
 Matthias Platzeck

S 
 Eugen Schiffer
 Wilhelmine Schirmer-Pröscher
 Jürgen Schmieder
 Günter Stempel

W 
 Kurt Wünsche

 
Liberal Democratic Party of Germany
Lib